St. Joseph's Convent Senior Secondary School is a co-educational secondary school located in Ratlam, Madhya Pradesh, India.
It is affiliated with Central Board of Secondary Education. The school covers primary (I to V) and secondary (VI to XII), of which the students can eventually prepare for the All India Senior School Certificate Examination.

History
The school was founded on 24 July 1956 by the Indian Province of the Sisters of St. Joseph of Chambéry and administered by its branch congregation in Ratlam. Bishop Simon of Indore wanted to open a co-ed school in Ratlam to give children in the area a proper education. The parish hall was used for the school and three students attended commencement.  Mary Agnes served as the first animator (leader) and Philomena as the first principal.

References

External links 
 

Schools in Madhya Pradesh